Duwayne Oriel Kerr (born 16 January 1987) is a Jamaican international footballer who plays as a goalkeeper.

Career

Club
Kerr has played club football in Jamaica for Reno and Portmore United.

Kerr moved to Norway in 2011, and played two seasons for the Norwegian First Division side Strømmen, and was the best goalkeeper in the 2012 Norwegian First Division according to Sarpsborg 08's Director of Sports, Thomas Berntsen. Kerr joined the newly promoted Tippeligaen side Sarpsborg 08 as a free agent of the 2013-season, and signed a two-year contract with the club.

In April 2016 he signed for Icelandic club Stjarnan. In August 2016, Kerr signed for Chennaiyin FC in the Indian Super League.

International
Kerr made his international debut for Jamaica in 2007.

International statistics

References

1987 births
Living people
Jamaican footballers
Jamaica international footballers
Portmore United F.C. players
Strømmen IF players
Sarpsborg 08 FF players
Stjarnan players
Chennaiyin FC players
Norwegian First Division players
Eliteserien players
Association football goalkeepers
Footballers at the 2007 Pan American Games
2011 CONCACAF Gold Cup players
2014 Caribbean Cup players
2015 Copa América players
Copa América Centenario players
Pan American Games competitors for Jamaica
Jamaican expatriate footballers
Jamaican expatriate sportspeople in Norway
Expatriate footballers in Norway
Jamaican expatriate sportspeople in Iceland
Expatriate footballers in Iceland
Jamaican expatriate sportspeople in India
Expatriate footballers in India
National Premier League players
People from Westmoreland Parish
Pan American Games silver medalists for Jamaica
Pan American Games medalists in football
Medalists at the 2007 Pan American Games